"Happyland"  is a song by Swedish singer Måns Zelmerlöw. The song was released as a digital download on 2 February 2018 through Warner Music Group as the fourth single from his seventh studio album Chameleon (2016).

Music video
A music video to accompany the release of "Happyland" was first released onto YouTube on 9 February 2018 at a total length of four minutes and four seconds.

Track listing

Charts

Weekly charts

Year-end charts

Release history

References

2016 songs
2018 singles
Måns Zelmerlöw songs
Songs written by Linnea Deb
Songs written by Joy Deb
Songs written by Ola Svensson
Songs written by Anton Hård af Segerstad